23S rRNA (adenine1618-N6)-methyltransferase (rRNA large subunit methyltransferase F, YbiN protein, rlmF (gene), m6A1618 methyltransferase) is an enzyme with systematic name S-adenosyl-L-methionine:23S rRNA (adenine1618-N6)-methyltransferase. This enzyme catalyses the following chemical reaction

 S-adenosyl-L-methionine + adenine1618 in 23S rRNA  S-adenosyl-L-homocysteine + N6-methyladenine1618 in 23S rRNA

The recombinant YbiN protein is able to methylate partially deproteinized 50 S ribosomal subunit.

References

External links 
 

EC 2.1.1